is the ninth single of the Japanese pop singer Miho Komatsu released under Giza Studio label. The single was released one and a half months after the previous single Saitan Kyori De. This is the last single released in 8 cm single format. The single reached #9 in its first week and sold 33,240. It charted for 8 weeks and sold 52,650 copies.

Track list
All songs are written and composed by Miho Komatsu and arranged by Hirohito Furui

the song was used as the first opening song for the anime series Monster Rancher. OA (on air) and single version have different arrangement. OA version was never officially released on CDs.
"Elephant"
 (instrumental)
"Elephant" (instrumental)

References 

1999 singles
Anime songs
Miho Komatsu songs
Songs written by Miho Komatsu
1999 songs
Giza Studio singles
Being Inc. singles
Monster Rancher
Song recordings produced by Daiko Nagato